Béziers Cathedral is a Roman Catholic church located in Béziers, France.

The edifice dates from the thirteenth century, having been erected on the site of an earlier building that was destroyed during the Massacre at Béziers in the Albigensian Crusade. The cathedral was formerly the seat of the Bishopric of Béziers, which was dissolved by the Concordat of 1801 and annexed into the Diocese of Montpellier.

Views of the Cathedral

Gallery 

 Catholic Encyclopedia: Diocese of Béziers, in article on Montpellier

Former cathedrals in France
Fortified church buildings in France
Churches in Hérault
Béziers